Andrew Ian Gait (born 19 December 1978) is a British–South African former cricketer who was born in Rhodesia. He is a right-handed batsman.

Gait has played in two Youth Test matches, scoring a half-century in his first, and also played at the Under-19s World Cup in 1998. His first domestic team was Free State, for whom he played between 1999 and 2001.

Signing to Derbyshire as a British citizen in readiness for the 2002 season was risky, as this mean Gait would count as an overseas player in South Africa and Free State had already lined up Jimmy Adams of the West Indies as its sole overseas player. Gait proved a revelation for the season, with an innings of 175 one of the highlights of his whole career. However, with trouble against swing bowlers, a problem for his game, his record in South Africa was better than his record in England.

Gait has appeared for Northamptonshire's Second XI in 2006, making a century on his Second XI Championship debut for the team.

References

External links
Andrew Gait at Cricket Archive 

1978 births
South African cricketers
Living people
Free State cricketers
Derbyshire cricketers
South African emigrants to the United Kingdom
English cricketers